Kikuoka  is a traditional Japanese shop with medicinal herbs, founded in 1184 and operated by the 24th generation of the same family. It is located in the historical city Nara in the Nara Prefecture, Japan.

See also
Plants used in traditional Chinese medicine
 List of oldest companies

References

External links 
 Company website
 Location on Google Maps

1180s establishments in Japan
Companies based in Nara Prefecture
Japanese brands